In the mathematical field of extremal graph theory, homomorphism density with respect to a graph  is a parameter  that is associated to each graph  in the following manner:

 .

There is a connection between homomorphism densities and subgraph densities, which is elaborated on below.

Examples 

Other important properties such as the number of stable sets or the maximum cut can be expressed or estimated in terms of homomorphism numbers or densities.

Subgraph densities 

 .

That said, the number of such degenerate homomorphisms is only , so we have . For instance, we see that for graphs with constant homomorphism density, the labeled subgraph density and homomorphism density are asymptotically equivalent. For  being a complete graph , the homomorphism density and subgraph density are in fact equal (for  without self-loops), as the edges of  force all images under a graph homomorphism to be distinct.

Generalization to graphons 
The notion of homomorphism density can be generalized to the case where instead of a graph , we have a graphon ,

 

For example, the triangle density in a graphon is given by 

 .  

This definition of homomorphism density is indeed a generalization, because for every graph  and its associated step graphon , .

The definition can be further extended to all symmetric, measurable functions . The following example demonstrates the benefit of this further generalization.

This notion is helpful in understanding asymptotic behavior of homomorphism densities of graphs which satisfy certain property, since a graphon is a limit of a sequence of graphs.

Inequalities 
Many results in extremal graph theory can be described by inequalities involving homomorphism densities associated to a graph. The following are a sequence of examples relating the density of triangles to the density of edges.

Turan's Theorem 
A classic example is Turán's Theorem, which states that if , then . A special case of this is Mantel's Theorem, which states that if , then .

Goodman's Theorem 
An extension of Mantel's Theorem provides an explicit lower bound on triangle densities in terms of edge densities.Theorem (Goodman).

Kruskal-Katona Theorem 
A converse inequality to Goodman's Theorem is a special case of Kruskal–Katona theorem, which states that . It turns out that both of these inequalities are tight for specific edge densities. 

Proof. It is sufficient to prove this inequality for any graph . By spectral graph theory, we know

The conclusion then comes from the following inequality:

 .

Description of triangle vs edge density 
The lower boundary is main result of work by Razborov in providing a complete description.

Useful tools

Cauchy-Schwarz 
One particularly useful inequality to analyze homomorphism densities is the Cauchy–Schwarz inequality. The effect of applying the Cauchy-Schwarz inequality is "folding" the graph over a line of symmetry to relate it to a smaller graph. This allows for the reduction of densities of large but symmetric graphs to that of smaller graphs. As an example, we prove that the cycle of length 4 is Sidorenko. If the vertices are labelled 1,2,3,4 in that order, the diagonal through vertices 1 and 3 is a line of symmetry. Folding over this line relates  to the complete bipartite graph . Mathematically, this is formalized as 

 

where we applied Cauchy-Schwarz to "fold" vertex 2 onto vertex 4. The same technique can be used to show , which combined with the above verifies that  is a Sidorenko graph. 

The generalization Hölder's inequality can also be used in a similar manner to fold graphs multiple times with a single step. It is also possible to apply the more general form of Cauchy-Schwarz to fold graphs in the case that certain edges lie on the line of symmetry.

Lagrangian 
The Lagrangian can be useful in analyzing extremal problems. The quantity is defined to be

 .

The following is an application of analyzing this quantity.

According to Hamed Hatami and Sergei Norine, one can convert any algebraic inequality between homomorphism densities to a linear inequality. In some situations, deciding whether such an inequality is true or not can be simplified, such as it is the case in the following theorem.Theorem (Bollobás). Let  be real constants. Then, the inequality

 

holds for every graph  if and only if it holds for every complete graph .

However, we get a much harder problem, in fact an undecidable one, when we have a homomorphism inequalities on a more general set of graphs :Theorem (Hatami, Norine). Let  be real constants, and  graphs. Then, it is an undecidable problem to determine whether the homomorphism density inequality

 

holds for every graph . A recent observation proves that any linear homomorphism density inequality is a consequence of the positive semi-definiteness of a certain infinite matrix, or to the positivity of a quantum graph; in other words, any such inequality would follow from applications of the Cauchy-Schwarz Inequality.

See also 
Common graph
Sidorenko's conjecture

References 

Extremal graph theory